The Malta national amateur football team alternates with Gozo national football team in representing Malta in the UEFA Regions' Cup. It is controlled by the Malta Football Association. The Malta national amateur football team debuted in the 2001 and has since participated in the 2003, 2005, 2007, 2009 and 2011 editions of the UEFA Regions' Cup. Moreover, following a hiatus of 11 years due to the combination of the participation by the Gozitan team and the COVID-19 pandemic, the Malta national amateur football team will be returning to the fore and will participate in the 2023 edition of the UEFA Regions' Cup.

Tournament records

Tournament performances

2001 UEFA Regions' Cup

Preliminary

2003 UEFA Regions' Cup

Preliminary

2005 UEFA Regions' Cup

Preliminary

2007 UEFA Regions' Cup

Intermediary

2009 UEFA Regions' Cup

Preliminary

Intermediary

2011 UEFA Regions' Cup

Intermediary

2023 UEFA Regions' Cup

Intermediary 
</onlyinclude>

Results

Squad 
The following 18 players were called up for the 2023 UEFA Regions' Cup.

See also 
UEFA Regions' Cup

References

External links 
Official website 
Malta at UEFA site
Maltafootball.com

Malta national football team
European national amateur association football teams